Fenerbahçe Basketball, commonly known as Fenerbahçe, currently also known as Fenerbahçe Beko for sponsorship reasons, are a professional basketball team and the men's basketball department of Fenerbahçe SK, a major Turkish multi-sport club based in Istanbul, Turkey. They are one of the most successful clubs in Turkish basketball history, being the first Turkish team to have won the EuroLeague, as well as 13 Turkish championships (10 titles in the Turkish Super League and three in the former Turkish Basketball Championship), seven Turkish Cups, and seven Turkish Super Cups, among others. They play their home matches at the club's own Ülker Sports and Event Hall.

Besides the European championship title in 2017, which was secured by a convincing 80–64 win against Greek powerhouse Olympiacos in the final, Fenerbahçe have also been EuroLeague runners-up in 2016 and 2018. Fener also have played in five consecutive EuroLeague Final Fours (2015, 2016, 2017, 2018, 2019) to date, a record in Turkish basketball. Currently, Fenerbahçe are considered to be one of the top teams of the Turkish Super League, which is among the best European national domestic basketball leagues.

Many memorable players in European basketball have played for Fenerbahçe over the years, some of which have included: Šarūnas Jasikevičius, Žan Tabak, Conrad McRae, Nemanja Bjelica, Ömer Aşık, Thabo Sefolosha, Linas Kleiza, Ömer Onan, Mirsad Türkcan, David Andersen, Harun Erdenay, Damir Mršić, Bojan Bogdanović, Semih Erden, Mahmoud Abdul-Rauf, Tanoka Beard, Nikos Zisis, James Gist, Gordan Giriček, Mike Batiste, Marko Milič, Will Solomon, Bo McCalebb, Ekpe Udoh, Pero Antić, Luigi Datome, Nikola Kalinić, Kostas Sloukas, Jan Veselý, Ali Muhammed, Nicolò Melli, Bogdan Bogdanović, and Nando De Colo.

Željko Obradović, the most successful coach in the history of European basketball, was the head coach of Fenerbahçe between 2013 and 2020. Obradović was replaced by former Phoenix Suns head coach Igor Kokoškov on July 2, 2020, following his decision to take a break from competitive basketball.

History

Early history and first titles
The men's basketball department of Fenerbahçe was initially founded in 1913, but could not persist due to the Balkan Wars and World War I. Eventually, under the initiative of Muhtar Sencer and Cem Atabeyoğlu, it was founded in its current permanent form in 1944 and achieved considerable success when the sport established itself in Turkey.

Fenerbahçe, who dominated the sport with notable players of the period such as Sacit Seldüz, Hikmet Vardar, Erdoğan Karabelen, Yılmaz Gündüz and Mehmet Baturalp under the leadership of memorable coach Samim Göreç, became champions of the Istanbul Basketball League in 1954–55, 1955–56, and 1956–57. By defeating their rivals Galatasaray 55–47 on February 5, 1955, which was the first basketball game broadcast live on radio in Turkey, Fener celebrated their first championship.
The club made a new breakthrough in amateur sports, after İsmet Uluğ, one of the former football players and boxers of the club became president in 1962, and won Istanbul League titles again in 1962–63, 1963–64, 1964–65 and 1965–66.

Fenerbahçe won Turkish Basketball Championship titles in 1957, 1959, and 1965 undefeated, just before the current professional Turkish Super League was founded in 1966, and made it to the European Champions Cup in 1960 and 1966.

Struggle against corporation teams and beginning of the rise (1970s–2014)

They remained a solid team in the rest of the 1960s, but had mixed success in the following decades, especially the 70s and 80s. Those decades were dominated by the likes of Efes Pilsen and Eczacıbaşı, and later also Ülkerspor, who won most of the titles. As these teams belonged to notable corporations with a solid financial background and support, traditional sports clubs such as Fenerbahçe had difficulties keeping up with them.
 
Fenerbahçe finished the league leader three times with stars such as Erman Kunter, Aytek Gürkan, Can Sonat, Ferhat Oktay, Pete Williams and Larry Richard in the seasons 1984–85, 1987–88 and 1989–90, but was eliminated in the playoffs. Erman Kunter broke the record by scoring 153 points in a game of the 1987–1988 season, in which the yellow-navy blues team beat Hilalspor 175–101.
Fenerbahçe would reach championship in 1991 that the fans were waiting for. Levent Topsakal, Larry Richard, Hüsnü Çakırgil and head coach Çetin Yılmaz led Fenerbahçe to the Turkish League title over Tofaş.

Fenerbahçe returned to the EuroLeague in 1992, but lost in the preliminary round. The club were back in the Turkish League finals in 1992, 1993, and 1995, but could not find a way to win the championship for some time. Fenerbahçe continued to have success in the late 90s. A third-place finish in the 1997–98 season allowed the club to return to the EuroLeague in 1998–99 season, and with players like Mahmoud Abdul-Rauf, Marko Milič, Žan Tabak, İbrahim Kutluay, and the late Conrad McRae, Fenerbahçe advanced to the eighth-final playoffs, losing there to Real Madrid. İbrahim Kutluay won the EuroLeague top scorer trophy with an average of 21.4 points.

The club made it to the Saporta Cup quarter-finals in 1994–95. The following season Fenerbahçe reached the quarter-finals of the Korać Cup in 1995–96 and repeated this achievement in 2000–01. The early 2000s, however, were with very limited success. After Aydın Örs started as a coach in 2004, Fenerbahçe returned to the Turkish League semifinals and had a great return to European competitions, finishing in fourth place in the 2004–05 FIBA Europe League. 

In the summer of 2006, the basketball club acquired a main sponsorship deal with Ülker, to form Fenerbahçe Ülker. After the sponsorship agreement, Fenerbahçe dominated the Turkish League and became the league champions two times in a row after 16 years and the team returned to the EuroLeague. After losing the Turkish League championship to Efes Pilsen in the 2008–09 season, in a closely contested playoff finals, Fenerbahçe became Turkish League champions again in the 2009–10 season, this time by defeating Efes Pilsen in the finals 4–2.

Fenerbahçe Ülker headed into the 2010–11 season with five new transfers: Engin Atsür, Šarūnas Jasikevičius, Marko Tomas, Kaya Peker, and Darjuš Lavrinovič. With new head coach Neven Spahija, Fenerbahçe Ülker continued their domination in the Turkish League, winning both the Turkish Cup and the Turkish League, over long time rivals Beşiktaş and Galatasaray, respectively.

After two disappointing seasons, in 2011–12 and 2012–13 where Fenerbahçe Ülker finished in fifth place in the Turkish league, legendary coach Željko Obradović was then signed as the team's head coach, and the roster was strengthened with the likes of former Toronto Raptor Linas Kleiza, promising power forward Nemanja Bjelica, consistent center Luka Žorić, and hot Turkish prospects Kenan Sipahi and Melih Mahmutoğlu. Fenerbahçe became the Turkish League champions once again, after beating eternal rivals Galatasaray in the playoff's finals of the 2013–14 season. Success in the EuroLeague, however, continued to elude the team.

At the top of Europe: Golden age with Obradović (2014–2020)

In the 2014–15 season, Fenerbahçe reached the EuroLeague Final Four for the first time in their history. In the quarterfinals, Fenerbahçe knocked out Maccabi Tel Aviv with three straight wins. In the semifinals, the team lost to Real Madrid, and eventually finished fourth. At the end of the season, the club's sponsorship agreement with Ülker ended. In the 2015–16 season, Fenerbahçe impressed in the EuroLeague Regular Season and Top 16, and qualified once again for the Final Four tournament, by eliminating the defending champions, Real Madrid, in the playoffs, again with a score of 3–0. During their first Final Four match against Laboral Kutxa, Fenerbahçe faced risking elimination once again before Kostas Sloukas made a game-tying lay-up to force the game into overtime, where Bogdan Bogdanović would help lead the team in overtime to win 88–77. The club became the first Turkish team to ever make it to the EuroLeague Final game. Their final opponent in the EuroLeague competition was CSKA Moscow. Fenerbahçe lost 101–96 after overtime.

In the following 2016–17 season, Fenerbahçe won their first European championship. The club beat Greek powerhouse Olympiacos 80–64 in the championship game of the Final Four, that was held in Istanbul. Fenerbahçe became the first and only Turkish team in history to win the EuroLeague title. Center Ekpe Udoh was named EuroLeague Final Four MVP. Following their European title, Fenerbahçe acquired a new main sponsor deal in the 2017 off-season. Doğuş Group signed a three-year contract with the club, worth an amount of €45 million, which guaranteed the club the largest name sponsorship deal in European basketball history.

In the 2017–18 season, Fenerbahçe finished second at the regular season of the EuroLeague. In the Playoffs, they faced off against Kirolbet Baskonia, whom they eliminated with 3–1 in the best-of-five series. Thus the club managed to reach the EuroLeague Final Four for the fourth time in a row, improving their record. The team eventually lost against Real Madrid in the championship final. Fenerbahçe also continued their domination of the Turkish Super League - after a setback in 2015, Fenerbahçe won the 2016, 2017, and 2018 championships in dominating fashion.

Before the beginning of the 2018–19 season, Doğuş withdrew from the sponsorship deal which originally was projected for three years. Following the unexpected retraction, a new main sponsorship agreement with Beko was initiated. During the 2018–19 season, Fenerbahçe became the only team who stayed undefeated at home after a 30-game regular season and secured the best record after a regular season (25–5) under the new EuroLeague format (2016–17 season to present). Fener also became the earliest EuroLeague Playoffs qualifiers ever in the modern EuroLeague era. Domestically, the Yellow-Navy Blues defeated rivals Anadolu Efes in the 2019 Turkish Cup final to claim their sixth title. Fenerbahçe defeated BC Žalgiris, 3–1, in the EuroLeague quarterfinals, qualifying to their fifth consecutive Final Four. In the EuroLeague Final Four, however, Fenerbahçe was beaten by Anadolu Efes in the semifinals, and Real Madrid in the third place game, finishing in a disappointing fourth place. In the Turkish Super League, Fenerbahçe once again made the finals - however, in an upset, they were again defeated by Anadolu Efes in a seven game series. 

The 2019-2020 season was the last under Obradović. Fenerbahçe managed to win the 2020 Turkish Cup by beating  Teksüt Bandırma in the quarterfinals, Türk Telekom in the semifinals, and Darüşşafaka in the finals. Despite improving their roster with signings like Derrick Williams and Nando De Colo, Fenerbahçe struggled in the EuroLeague - at the time the season was stopped due to the coronavirus pandemic, Fenerbahçe was fighting for the final playoff spot, and in the Turkish Super League, Fenerbahçe was just 4th - behind Anadolu Efes, Pınar Karşıyaka and Galatasaray. Both tournaments were cancelled with no champions announced. In the summer, coach Obradović resigned.

Post-Obradović (2020–present)
Fenerbahçe signed former Phoenix Suns head coach Igor Kokoškov to replace Obradović. Fenerbahçe underwent many changes during the post season, though managed to keep top players like Vesely and De Colo on the roster. The team greatly struggled in the EuroLeague, suffering many embarrassing blowout loses in the beginning, and fell quickly behind Anadolu Efes in the Turkish Super League standings, but with the late season signing of Marko Gudurić, the team greatly improved. A winning streak in the EuroLeague helped Fenerbahçe make the EuroLeague playoffs with a 20-14 record and 7th place in the regular season. In the playoffs, Fenerbahçe was swept by CSKA Moscow. In the Turkish Super League, Fenerbahçe returned to the finals and faced the 2021 EuroLeague champions Anadolu Efes, who easily swept Fenerbahçe in the finals. Despite signing a long term contract, Kokoškov left Fenerbahçe during the summer. 

During the off-season, Fenerbahçe signed Saša Đorđević as the new head coach. Fenerbahçe had higher expectations for the season than the previous year. In the EuroLeague, Fenerbahçe struggled, and for the first time since the 2013-2014 season, failed to make the playoffs - finishing in a disappointing 12th place, and coach Đorđević suffered much criticism. To add more insult, Anadolu Efes repeated as the 2022 EuroLeague champions. In the re-established Turkish Cup, Fenerbahçe was beaten by Anadolu Efes. However, in the Turkish Super League, Fenerbahçe got their revenge - they finished over Efes in the regular season standings, earning home-court advantage for the playoffs, and made the finals - in the finals, Fenerbahçe beat Anadolu Efes 3-1 to win the championship, their record breaking 10th Turkish League championship.

Sponsorship naming
Due to sponsorship deals, Fenerbahçe have been also known as:

 Fenerbahçe Ülker (2006–2015)
 Fenerbahçe Doğuş (2017–2018)
 Fenerbahçe Beko (2018–present)

Home courts

Players

Current roster

Depth chart

Squad changes for the 2022–23 season

Retired numbers

Honours

Domestic competitions
 Turkish Super League 
 Winners (10): 1990–91, 2006–07, 2007–08, 2009–10, 2010–11, 2013–14, 2015–16, 2016–17, 2017–18, 2021–22
 Runners-up (10): 1967–68, 1969–70, 1970–71, 1982–83, 1984–85, 1992–93, 1994–95, 2008–09, 2018–19, 2020–21
 Turkish Championship (1946–1967)
 Winners (3): 1957, 1959, 1965
 Runners-up (6): 1954, 1956, 1958, 1963, 1964, 1967
 Turkish Cup 
 Winners (7): 1966–67, 2009–10, 2010–11, 2012–13, 2016, 2019, 2020
 Runners-up (5): 1993–94, 1996–97, 1998–99, 2014–15,  2022
 Turkish Presidential Cup
 Winners (7): 1990, 1991, 1994, 2007, 2013, 2016, 2017 
Runners-up (10): 1985, 1988, 2008, 2009, 2010, 2011, 2014, 2018, 2019, 2022

European competitions
 EuroLeague 
 Winners (1): 2016–17
 Runners-up (2): 2015–16, 2017–18
 4th place (2): 2014–15, 2018–19
 Final Four (5): 2015, 2016, 2017, 2018, 2019

Regional competitions
 Istanbul League (defunct)
 Winners (7): 1954–55, 1955–56, 1956–57, 1962–63, 1963–64, 1964–65, 1965–66
 Runners-up (3): 1950–51, 1953–54, 1957–58
 Istanbul Second League (defunct)
 Winners (2): 1945–46, 1948–49

Individual club awards
 Continental Treble
 Winners (1): 2016–17

Other competitions
 Zadar Basketball Tournament
 Winners (4) (record): 2014, 2015, 2017, 2018
 Runners-up (1): 2016
 Cártama, Malaga, Spain Invitational Game
 Winners (1): 2016
 Torneo Costa de Sol:
 Winners (1): 2016
 Istanbul, Turkey Invitational Game
 Winners (1): 2017
 Bologna, Italy Invitational Game
 Winners (1): 2019
 Treviso, Italy Invitational Game
 Winners (1): 2019
 TUBAD Basketball Tournament
 Winners (3): 2005, 2020, 2022

The road to the EuroLeague victory

European history

Fenerbahçe participated in European competitions numerous times throughout their history and became the most successful Turkish club ever. By winning the former Turkish Basketball Championship, the club represented Turkey for their first time in the FIBA European Champions Cup in 1959–60 and again in 1965–66. Some years later, they made it to the FIBA European Cup quarter-finals in the 1994–95 season. The following season Fenerbahçe reached the quarter-finals of the FIBA Korać Cup in 1996 and repeated this achievement in 2001. In the 1998–99 season of the FIBA EuroLeague, they reached the Top 16 stage, but lost there to Real Madrid. The club became fourth in the 2004–05 season of the FIBA EuroChallenge. The first major success in the modern era EuroLeague was achieved in the 2007–08 season, where Fenerbahçe reached the quarter-finals. The first Final Four participation in the history of the club followed some years later, in the 2014–15 season, when the team eliminated reigning European champions Maccabi Tel Aviv in the play-offs with three straight victories under the guidance of legendary coach Željko Obradović. In the semi-final game they lost against Real Madrid and eventually finished fourth. In the next season, the club reached the final of the competition with a convincing overall performance, again by eliminating the reigning champions (Real Madrid) with three straight wins, and lost dramatically against CSKA Moscow in overtime. Then eventually, in 2017, Fenerbahçe managed to win the EuroLeague trophy as the first and only Turkish club ever, in their own city, by defeating Greek giants Olympiacos in the final game with a score of 80–64. From the quarter-finals onwards, the club eliminated their opponents in dominating fashion, first sweeping Greek giants  Panathinaikos Superfoods with 3–0 wins despite the home-court disadvantage, and then defeating European powerhouses Real Madrid and Olympiacos with being behind only for a few seconds in total in the Final Four in Istanbul.

Statistics 

Pld = Matches played; W = Matches won; L = Matches lost; PF = Points for; PA = Points against; PD = Point Difference; PCT = Winning percentage.

By team / by country

Against NBA teams
On 5 October 2012, Fenerbahçe became the first and only Turkish basketball club to win against an NBA team, having beaten the Boston Celtics by a score of 97–91 at the Ülker Sports Arena. By defeating the Brooklyn Nets 101–96 in Barclays Center on 5 October 2015, Fenerbahçe became the first and only Turkish basketball club and only third club in basketball history to win against an NBA team in the United States.

Season by season

Individual awards and achievements

Retired Numbers
6 Mirsad Türkcan
7 Ömer Onan

50 Greatest EuroLeague Contributors

Chosen:
 Šarūnas Jasikevičius
 Željko Obradović
Nominated:
 İbrahim Kutluay
 Mirsad Türkcan

EuroLeague Legends
 Šarūnas Jasikevičius
 Mirsad Türkcan

EuroLeague Basketball 2000–10 All-Decade Team

Chosen:
 Šarūnas Jasikevičius
Nominated:
 İbrahim Kutluay
 Mirsad Türkcan

EuroLeague Basketball 2010–20 All-Decade Team

Chosen:
 Bogdan Bogdanović
 Nando de Colo
Nominated:
 Kostas Sloukas
 Michael Batiste
 Devin Smith
 Luigi Datome
 Ekpe Udoh
 Nicolò Melli
 Nemanja Bjelica
 James Gist
 Pero Antić
 Jan Veselý

EuroLeague MVP
 Nemanja Bjelica (2014–15)
 Jan Veselý (2018–19)

EuroLeague Final Four MVP
 Ekpe Udoh (2016–17)

All-EuroLeague First Team
 Nemanja Bjelica (2014–15)
 Jan Veselý (2015–16, 2017–18, 2018–19)
 Bogdan Bogdanović (2016–17)
 Ekpe Udoh (2016–17)
 Kostas Sloukas (2018–19)

All-EuroLeague Second Team
 Andrew Goudelock (2014–15)
 Ekpe Udoh (2015–16)
 Luigi Datome (2015–16)
 Nando de Colo (2020–21)

EuroLeague MVP of the Month
 Nemanja Bjelica (2014–15, March)
 Jan Veselý (2015–16, January), (2018–19, December), (2020–21, January)
 Ekpe Udoh (2015–16, April)
 Bogdan Bogdanović (2016–17, April)

EuroLeague Rising Star
 Bogdan Bogdanović (2014–15)

EuroLeague Coach of the Year
 Željko Obradović (2016–17)

EuroLeague Executive of the Year
 Maurizio Gherardini (2016–17)

EuroLeague Magic Moment of the Season
 Jan Veselý (2017–18 with an Alley-oop dunk over Brandon Davies)
 Jan Veselý (2018–19 with an Alley-oop dunk)
 
EuroLeague records since 2000–01
  Andrew Goudelock: Most 3-point field goals made in a game (10) (2014–15, Week 5)
 Ekpe Udoh: Most blocked shots (68) (2016–17)

EuroLeague Top Scorer
 İbrahim Kutluay (1998–99)

EuroLeague Rebounding Leaders
1998–99 Žan Tabak: 10.00 (in 18 games)
2008–09 Mirsad Türkcan: 8.64 (in 14 games)
2010–11 Mirsad Türkcan: 7.33 (in 12 games)

EuroLeague Blocked Shoots Leaders
2007–08 Ömer Aşık: 2.06 (in 15 games)
2015–16 Ekpe Udoh: 2.12 (in 25 games)

Turkish Super League Finals MVP
 Tarence Kinsey (2009–10)
 Oğuz Savaş (2010–11)
 Luigi Datome (2015–16)
 Bogdan Bogdanović (2016–17)
 Brad Wanamaker (2017–18)
 Jan Veselý (2021–22)

Turkish League Top Scorer
 Hüseyin Kozluca (1968–69)
 Erman Kunter (1987–88)
 İbrahim Kutluay (1998–99)

Turkish Cup Final MVP
 Emir Preldžić (2010–11)
 David Andersen (2012–13)
 Bogdan Bogdanović (2016)
 Luigi Datome (2019, 2020)

Turkish Super Cup MVP
 Bobby Dixon (2016)
 Luigi Datome (2017)

Sponsorship and kit manufacturers 

1 Main sponsorship
2 Back sponsorship
3 Short sponsorship
4 Transportation sponsor
(*) One Embraer 195 jet (TC-YAT) is painted with Fenerbahçe SK's livery

Team captains

Head coaches

Notable players

Notable coaches 
  Samim Göreç (1951–1966)
  Çetin Yılmaz (1989–1993)
  Aydın Örs (2004–2007)
  Bogdan Tanjević (2007–2010)
  Neven Spahija (2010–2012)
  Željko Obradović (2013–2020)

See also 
 Fenerbahçe SK
 Fenerbahçe Women's Basketball

References

External links 
 
  
 TBLStat.net Profile 
 Eurobasket.com Profile

 
 
Basketball teams established in 1913
Basketball teams in Turkey
EuroLeague clubs
EuroLeague-winning clubs
Turkish Basketball Super League teams
1913 establishments in the Ottoman Empire
Sports teams in Istanbul